FL-IX, owned and operated by non-profit organization Community IX Holdings, allows ISPs, content providers and enterprises to exchange IP traffic in
the south Florida region. FL-IX is available in Miami, Boca Raton, Ft. Lauderdale (United States). FL-IX was founded by Zayo Group, Netflix and Host.net (now 365 Data Centers).

See also 
 List of Internet exchange points

References 

Internet exchange points in the United States
Telecommunications in the United States